The Cambridge Science Park,  founded by Trinity College in 1970, is the oldest science park in the United Kingdom. It is a concentration of science and technology related businesses, and has strong links with the nearby University of Cambridge.

The science park is situated about 3 km to the north of Cambridge city centre, by junction 33 of the A14, in the parish of Milton, contiguous with Cambridge itself. The park is served by Cambridge North railway station and by the Cambridgeshire Guided Busway. It is directly adjacent to St John's Innovation Centre and Cambridge Business Park.

History 

The land was originally given to Trinity College when the latter was founded by Henry VIII in 1546. The land was used for farming until the Second World War, when it was requisitioned by the US Army and used to prepare vehicles and tanks for D-Day. After the war, the land was left derelict until 1970, when, at the suggestion of Tony Cornell, and under the supervision of Sir John Bradfield, the college worked with Sir Francis Pemberton of Bidwells to develop it into a new centre for scientific enterprise and innovation.

In 2017, following decades of rapid expansion in Cambridge, the park appointed its first director and announced a large investment intended to improve facilities and reduce traffic congestion.

Notable companies

Bio-medical

Abcam
Amgen
Astex
AstraZeneca
Bayer
British American Tobacco
Dr. Reddy's Laboratories
Napp Pharmaceuticals
Royal Society of Chemistry
Merck Group

Computer/telecoms

Arthur D. Little
Bamboo
Broadcom
Citrix Systems
Cryptomathic
Dassault Systèmes
DisplayLink
FlexEnable
Frontier Developments
Gearset
Huawei
Jagex
Linguamatics
Pragamatic
Ricardo plc
Toshiba
Vix Technology

Industrial technology

Aveva
Beko
Heraeus
Johnson Matthey
Philips
Roku, Inc.
Xaar plc

Other

Cambridge Assessment
Cambridge Consultants
Endomag
Grant Thornton UK LLP
Signal Processors Ltd
Worldpay

Cambridge Fun Run

The Cambridge Fun Run is a charity race for Children in Need organised and mainly entered by employees of businesses based in and around the Science Park.  It has been held each November since 1989.  Contestants compete in teams of four, some in fancy dress, running either one lap (as a group) or four laps (as a relay) of the  Science Park ring road. The race begins and ends, and medals and trophies are awarded (for fastest runners and best costumes) in front of the Cambridge Consultants building.

Gallery

See also
List of science parks in the United Kingdom
 Silicon Fen

Notes

References

External links

Cambridge Science Park

1972 establishments in England
Science Park
Economy of Cambridgeshire
Science Park
Science Park
High-technology business districts in the United Kingdom
Science parks in the United Kingdom
Trinity College, Cambridge